"Pano" (transl. How) is a song recorded by Filipino singer-songwriter Zack Tabudlo. It was released to music and streaming platforms on December 6, 2021, by Island Records Philippines and UMG Philippines. Self-written and produced by Tabudlo, the lyrics allude to self-pity and questioning one's unrequited love.

"Pano" is described as a pop ballad with minimal instruments, similar to Tabudlo's sound in his debut album, Episode. The song was a commercial success, becoming the longest-running number-one OPM song on Spotify Philippines. It also became the first number-one song to debut on the Billboard Philippines Songs chart, staying at its peak for eleven weeks. Internationally, the track charted in other Southeast Asian countries, including Malaysia, Thailand, and Vietnam.

An accompanying lyric video for the song was uploaded to YouTube simultaneously with the single's release, becoming Tabudlo's most viewed video on the platform. After gaining prominence on TikTok, a music video was released on Oct 3, 2022 as the first part of a trilogy. Tabudlo performed "Pano" during several live performances, including Expo 2020 Dubai, Head in the Clouds Manila, and at Wish 107.5. It has been covered by several artists and was used as the theme song for What We Could Be (2022).

Background 
Inspired by different styles of alt-pop, R&B, and blues, Zack Tabudlo marked the release of his debut full-length studio and visual album, Episode, on October 15, 2021. The album and its tracks topped different charts on Spotify and was certified 2× Platinum by the Philippine Association of the Record Industry, led by the success of the singles "Habang Buhay" and "Binibini".

In early December, Tabudlo announced through his social media about his new single "Pano" to be released on his birthday (December 6) as a gift to his fans, ultimately ending the promotion cycle of Episode. He envisioned "Pano" to be a song about "showing your vulnerability and genuine love.”

Composition 
"Pano" is described as an R&B-pop ballad with minimal production and guitar elements. The song is in the key of E  major, playing at 175 bpm with a running time of 4:14 minutes. 

Lyrically, Tabudlo defined how the track is about self-pity, heartbreak, and unrequited love, despite one's efforts.

Commercial performance 

"Pano" debuted at number 3 on the Spotify Top Songs - Philippines weekly chart dated December 16, 2021. On its second week, the single reached number one and retained its spot for 18 consecutive weeks. "Pano" also remained atop the Spotify Top 50 - Philippines chart for 62 days, breaking the record for the longest running number-one OPM song on the history of Spotify Philippines, previously held by IV of Spades’ “Mundo”. The single extended its record to 122 days, with a total of 139 million streams as of March 8, 2023. On Spotify Wrapped, "Pano" placed as the fourth most-played Philippine track in 2022.

On February 15, Billboard launched the Philippines Songs chart as part of its Hits of the World collection, in which "Pano" debuted at number one on the chart dated February 19. The track set several records, becoming the first song in the history of the chart to peak at number one, the first song to debut on top, and the first chart-topper performed and written by a Filipino musician. The song stayed at number one for 11 weeks.

Internationally, the song gained popularity in other Southeast Asian countries through its use in TikTok, drawing 100 million views on the platform. In Vietnam, "Pano" entered the Top 15 of Spotify Top 50 daily chart and the Top 50 of Billboard Vietnam Hot 100, a rarity for foreign songs in the country. The song peaked at number 14 on the Vietnam Hot 100 chart dated December 22, 2022 in its fourth week of charting. In Malaysia, the track debuted and peaked at number 19 in the Malaysia Songs chart ending on November 26. It is also the first Filipino song to enter the Spotify Top 50 - Malaysia chart, peaking at number 33. In Thailand, "Pano" ranked at number one on the international music charts of Line Melody for February 2023.

Videos

Lyric Video 
An accompanying lyric video for the song was uploaded onto Tabudlo's YouTube channel on December 6, 2021. As of March 2023, the lyric video has amassed 101 million views, becoming the singer's most viewed video on the platform and the most viewed song in the Philippines in 2022.

With its rising recognition overseas, Tabudlo released four lyric videos of "Pano" on November 28, 2022 in different languages (Bahasa Indonesia, Vietnamese, Bahasa Malaysia, and Thai). The promotion was met with critical acclaim from the countries for its local accessibility, boosting both the Vietnamese and Thai versions of "Pano" to over 5 million views as of March 8, 2023.

Music Video 
The music video for "Pano" was directed by Dominic Bakaert and premiered through Vevo on Oct 3, 2022. Advertised as the first part of a trilogy, it stars Kira Balinger as a frustrated painter coming from a breakup, along with Tabudlo as her friend who helps her move on despite his unrequited feelings for her. After Balinger suffers an alcohol-influenced breakdown, Tabudlo comforts her. The music video has reached 1 million views as of March 8, 2023.

Live performances 
Tabudlo made his debut performance of "Pano" during the Jubilee Stage of Expo 2020 in Dubai, United Arab Emirates on February 20, 2022. He performed the song as a duet with singer Denize Castillo in his online concert titled "Sabihin Mo Na", airing the performance through YouTube and Facebook on March 5. Embarking on a North American joint tour with December Avenue, he performed the song across eight venues in the United States from April 30 to May 28.

Besides gigs and mall shows, Tabudlo performed "Pano" on major festivals including Okada's Malaya Music Fest on June 18, Coke Studio's Tugatog Filipino Music Festival on July 15, We the Fest Indonesia 2022 on September 24, Music Is Universal Singapore on September 27, UMUSIC Fanverse Manila on October 23, and Cebu Aurora Fest 2022 on November 19. The song's live recording at the Wish 107.5 Bus was uploaded to YouTube on November 25. The track was also included in the setlist for Head in the Clouds Manila on December 9 held at Parañaque City.

In 2023, "Pano" was also part of Tabudlo's setlist for Circus Music Festival on January 7, BGC Love Street on February 18, and Music Is Universal Malaysia on March 4.

Cover versions and media usage 
Following the song's debut, "Pano" was covered by several artists, including Zephanie, SB19, and Kristel Fulgar.

On June 24, 2022, GMA Network announced "Pano" as the official theme song for the television drama What We Could Be (2022), starring Miguel Tanfelix and Ysabel Ortega.

Credits and personnel 
Credits are adapted from UMG Philippines.

 Zack Tabudlo – lead vocals, backing vocals, producer, mixing engineer, mastering

Charts

Release history

References

External links 
 Pano (Official Lyric Video) on YouTube
 Pano (Official Music Video) on YouTube

2021 songs
2021 singles
Tagalog-language songs
Filipino language songs
Philippine pop songs
2020s ballads
Number-one singles in the Philippines